Bioscope Film Framers is an Indian film production and distribution company headed by R. Parthiepan.

History 
In 1999, during the making of Housefull, Parthieban set up Bioscope Film Framers. He had previously made films with his ex-wife Seetha under the banner of Ammu Movies, but chose to begin a new studio after their separation. Alongside Parthiban, his children Abhinaya, Raakki and Keerthana have also been credited as producers under the banner.

For the making of Kudaikul Mazhai, Parthiepan set up advertisement company called "Gossip" to take care of publicity in the print and electronic media. The studio's next film, Oththa Seruppu, will be the first Tamil film and the second Indian film to feature just a single actor throughout.

Filmography

References 

Film distributors of India
Film production companies based in Chennai
Indian film studios
1992 establishments in Tamil Nadu
Indian companies established in 1992
Mass media companies established in 1992